Edmond Topalli (born 22 January 1980 in Shkodër) is an Albanian judoka, who played for the half-middleweight category. Topalli represented Albania at the 2008 Summer Olympics in Beijing, where he competed for the men's half-middleweight class (81 kg). He received a bye for the second preliminary match, before losing out by an automatic ippon and a sode tsurikomi goshi (sleeve lifting and pulling hip throw) to Portugal's João Neto.

References

External links

1980 births
Living people
Albanian male judoka
Olympic judoka of Albania
Judoka at the 2008 Summer Olympics
Sportspeople from Shkodër